Novius amabilis is a species of lady beetle native to India and Sri Lanka.

Description
The body length of Novius amabilis is about 3.25 mm.

Biology
The species is a predator of Icerya purchasi, and Saccharicoccus sacchari.

References 

Coccinellidae
Insects of Sri Lanka
Beetles described in 1949